Carlos Vásquez may refer to:

 Carlos Vásquez (baseball) (born 1982), Minor League baseball pitcher
 Carlos Vásquez (basketball) (1942–1984), Peruvian Olympic basketball player
 Carlos Vásquez (footballer)
 Carlos Vásquez (taekwondo) (born 1982), Venezuelan taekwondo practitioner